Sameep Singh Ranaut is an Indian actor from Punjab. He is best known for his child roles as young Harjeet Singh in Harjeeta and Gagan in Uda Aida. He also won Best Child Artist award at 66th National Film Awards for his debut role in Harjeeta.

Career 

Ranaut made his acting debut with the film Harjeeta (2018). He did not give any auditions for the film in fact he was discovered by Sawan Rupowali playing hockey where she recorded Ranaut's audition clip.

Filmography

Awards and nominations 

 Won Best Child Artist award at 66th National Film Awards for Harjeeta (2018)

References

External links 
 

Best Child Artist National Film Award winners
Year of birth missing (living people)
Living people
Indian male film actors
21st-century Indian male actors
21st-century Indian male child actors